L. (Lewis) Francis Herreshoff (November 11, 1890 – December 1972), was a boat designer, naval architect, editor, and author of books and magazine articles. Early in his career he worked for the Herreshoff Manufacturing and for naval architect Starling Burgess.

Biography
Herreshoff was born on November 11, 1890, in Bristol, Rhode Island, to Clara Anna DeWolf (1853–1905) and Nathanael Greene Herreshoff (1848–1938). In 1926, after naval service and work for Starling Burgess, he went into business for himself in Marblehead, Massachusetts, as a designer of racing and pleasure yachts, canoes, kayaks and other small craft. Herreshoff died December 1972.

Herreshoff was inducted into the National Sailing Hall of Fame in 2014.

Notable designs  
Herreshoff's designs included:
 A series of graceful clipper-bowed ketches: Ticonderoga 72 ft, Tioga/Bounty 57 ft, Mobjack 45 Ft and Nereia 36
 A shoal-draft leeboarder: Meadowlark
 Arguably the original "passagemaker"; the inspiration for Beebe's book, and an indirect inspiration for Perry's "container boat": Marco Polo.
 His answer to Hanna's ideas about the ideal homebuild: H-28
 The  Merlin, sunk on July 7, 1999 by a humpback whale in Whale Bay, Baranof Island, Alaska.
Buzzards Bay 14
Herreshoff Prudence
Herreshoff Rozinante
Stuart Knockabout

Publications
His books include The Common Sense of Yacht Design, The Compleat Cruiser, Capt. Nat Herreshoff: The Wizard of Bristol, The Writings of L. Francis Herreshoff, Sensible Cruising Designs and An L. Francis Herreshoff Reader.  He published numerous magazine articles, notably the 'How To Build' series in the magazine The Rudder.  Herreshoff's success as an author is especially impressive in one sense; his dyslexia had led his father to shunt him into agricultural school.

See also 
 Herreshoff Castle
 Herreshoff family
 Herreshoff anchor

References

1890 births
1972 deaths
American yacht designers
Engineers from Rhode Island
Herreshoff family